Milan Levov (born 5 April 1987) is a retired Macedonian handball player.

References
https://web.archive.org/web/20150506031810/http://ekipa.mk/levov-mesto-vo-zomimak-gi-zasili-redovite-na-rk-ohrid/
http://sportmedia.mk/rakomet/domashna-liga/levov-trenira-so-pelister-se-cheka-samo-potpis
http://ekipa.mk/levov-od-deneska-na-treninzi-so-rabotnichki/
http://24rakomet.mk/?p=22339
http://sportmedia.mk/rakomet/domashna-liga/rabotnichki-kje-se-razdeli-so-stoilov-i-levov
http://24rakomet.mk/?p=24807
http://sportmedia.mk/rakomet/domashna-liga/neka-puknat-dushmanite-maks-strumica-kje-se-vrati-ushte-posilna-foto
http://www.g-sport.mk/vest-statija/77463/ja-zavrshi-karierata-i-otide-na-pechalba-vo-afrika

1987 births
Living people
Macedonian male handball players
Sportspeople from Kavadarci
Expatriate handball players